Mirror Master is the name of several supervillains appearing in American comic books published by DC Comics. He is a recurring foe of the Flash with considerable technical expertise and skills involving the use of mirrors. Three individuals have donned the guise of Mirror Master, and have been members of the Rogues. In 2009, Mirror Master was ranked as IGN's 79th Greatest Comic Book Villain of All Time.

Both incarnations of Mirror Master have made several appearances in DC-related media, with Sam Scudder being portrayed in live-action by David Cassidy in the 1990 The Flash series and by Grey Damon in the 2014 The Flash series, while Efrat Dor portrayed a gender-swapped version of Evan McCulloch, named Eva McCulloch, in the 2014 series.

Publication history
The Sam Scudder version of Mirror Master first appeared in The Flash #105, and was created by John Broome and Carmine Infantino.

The Evan McCulloch version of Mirror Master first appeared in Animal Man #8, and was created by Grant Morrison and Chas Truog.

Fictional character biography

Sam Scudder

Samuel Joseph Scudder is a simple convict, but has the goal to learn how to get inside the reflection of a mirror. Stumbling into a hall of mirrors, he experiments and discovers a way to get in his own reflection. He uses this power to become the criminal Mirror Master, and is a frequent foe of the Flash. Scudder dies around the same time as Barry Allen, alongside the Icicle during the Crisis on Infinite Earths. Later, Captain Boomerang briefly assumes Scudder's identity, becoming the second Mirror Master. He uses this as an alternate identity with which to commit crimes, thus not alerting his teammates in the Suicide Squad to his extracurricular activities. Pre-Crisis, he studies mirrors after someone's reflection is held inside a mirror he was working on in the prison workshop. He then learns how to create creatures of light.

In the Blackest Night crossover event, Sam Scudder is reanimated as an undead Black Lantern during the Blackest Night and is preparing an attack on the Rogues with the other deceased members, who are also reanimated.

The Rogues visit Sam Scudder's old hideout and unveil a giant mirror with the words In Case of Flash: Break Glass. It has been shown in several past incidents that something lives in the mirror universe that is deadly. The Rogues learn that the giant mirror is actually a slow-acting poison.

In The New 52, a 2011 reboot of the DC Comics universe, Sam Scudder is the current Mirror Master. It is revealed that a year prior he, Captain Cold, Heat Wave and Weather Wizard underwent a procedure at an unknown facility that would merge them with their weapons, giving them superpowers. The procedure went awry, causing an explosion at the facility. Golden Glider, who was also at the facility, was caught in the explosion. The five were given superpowers but each in a twisted manner. Heat Wave gains pyrokinesis but at the cost of his body being burned, Weather Wizard becomes emotionally tied to his weather wand causing constant depression, Sam would be forever trapped in Mirror World, and Golden Glider becomes an astral projection of herself. It is implied that Sam is in a romantic relationship with her. The Rogues blame Captain Cold for this and have turned against him because of it.

Evan McCulloch

Scottish mercenary Evan McCulloch is left as a baby on the doorstep of an orphanage run by a Mrs. McCulloch, with nothing but his first name and a photograph of his parents. He grows up fairly normal and around age 8, Evan is sexually assaulted by an older boy. Evan, in self-defense, drowns the boy in a creek. Never caught, Evan leaves the orphanage at 16 with his parents' photograph.

He settles in Glasgow, taking up a life that leads to crime and eventually takes up employment as an assassin. He becomes one of the most renowned mercenaries in the United Kingdom. One day, he has two hits scheduled, and due to an eye injury is barely able to make out his second target. After firing his shot, he recognizes the target as his father. At the funeral, Evan sees his mother.

Over the next few days, he tries to work up the courage to see her, but visits her too late, discovering that she has committed suicide. Stricken with grief at the loss of both parents, Evan decides to turn himself in but is instead picked up by a consortium of U.S. government and big business interests, who offer him the costume and weapons of the original Mirror Master in exchange for his services.

His first assignment is to scare Animal Man into abandoning his animal-rights stance, a mission he fails thanks to the hero's wife. After he is fired and replaced for refusing to actually kill Animal Man's wife and children, McCulloch helps Animal Man track and fight the same men who gave McCulloch his weapons, but his heroism is short-lived. He continued to work as a criminal and a supervillain-for-hire. On occasion, he has also worked out of costume as a mercenary in Britain.

He moves to Keystone City and comes into conflict with Wally West, now the third Flash. He discovers a "Mirror Dimension" which enables him to travel through any reflective surface. During the events of Underworld Unleashed, the Rogues accept him as Scudder's successor. After being betrayed by Neron, McCulloch and four of the other Rogues die and go to Hell, only to return after a confrontation between Neron and the Flash. For a brief time, McCulloch is a member of Lex Luthor's initial Injustice Gang and fights the Justice League, but abandons the team when Batman offers to pay him twice what Luthor was offering.

During a brief team-up with Captain Cold, Mirror Master was contacted by Brother Grimm about a plan to permanently get rid of the Flash, but when Grimm betrayed Cold and McCulloch by trapping them in a pocket mirror universe in Linda Park's diamond ring, they joined forces with Wally to escape this dimension and confront Grimm's theft of Keystone City, Wally even briefly lending speed to the two Rogues so that they could ensure that Keystone's citizens were all in the city when it returned to Earth while Wally fought Grimm.

He works with Blacksmith in her takeover of Keystone and Central City. When her plan fails, he joins Captain Cold's gang and battles a cocaine addiction. He seems to sober up since the death of Captain Boomerang.

McCulloch joins Alexander Luthor, Jr.'s Secret Society after the Rogue War. He, Captain Boomerang and Captain Cold battle the Outsiders before Infinite Crisis. In Infinite Crisis #7, they all participate in the Battle of Metropolis, being defeated by the Martian Manhunter.

One Year Later, Evan is a member of the new Suicide Squad, again using cocaine. He is seen taking incriminating photos of Sasha Bordeaux and Michael Holt together. The Rogues are then persuaded by Inertia, an enemy of Bart Allen, the Flash IV, to kill the Flash. This makes all the Rogues angry for being tricked when they find out they murdered a kid.

Mirror Master is one of the exiled villains in the Salvation Run along with his fellow Rogues Captain Cold, Heat Wave, Weather Wizard, and Abra Kadabra.

After the villains escape, he joins Libra's Secret Society of Super Villains.

Evan teams with Doctor Light to recover Metron's chair, and are challenged by, but defeat, the League of Titans, a Teen Titans spin-off team. Evan persuades the rapist Dr. Light not to sexually assault the unconscious heroines. Evan and the rest of the Rogues reject Libra's offer, wanting to stay out of the game, and take their revenge on Inertia.

Mirror Master and the Rogues visit his predecessor Sam Scudder's old hideout and unveil a giant mirror with the words In Case of Flash: Break Glass written on it. Afterward, McCulloch is still on the run with the Rogues.

Powers and abilities
Mirror Master uses mirrors that produce fantastic effects such as hypnotism, invisibility, holograms, physical transformations, communications and travel into other dimensions (other parallel universes or planes of existence).

Evan McCulloch uses a laser pistol.

Other versions

Tangent Mirror Master
A Mirror Master featured in Tangent: Superman's Reign #1, has a body made of a glass-like substance, and was able to create portals to other worlds in the Multiverse.

League Busters Mirror Master
A fourth Mirror Master who wears a purple outfit briefly appeared as a member of the "League-Busters" in Justice League International v2, #65 (Jun 1994).

New Rogues
The New Rogues version of Mirror Master is Mirror Man, an unknown man who possesses Mirrors Stolen until killed by Trickster in Final Crisis: Rogues' Revenge. He is not to be confused with the Batman villain of the same name.

Flashpoint
In the alternate timeline of the Flashpoint event, Evan McCulloch is imprisoned in the mirrors in a place called the Mirrorverse. It is mostly assumed Captain Cold killed him, and he cannot leave the Mirrorverse or he will die. Anyone else entering the Mirrorverse will die also. Mirror Master assembles the Rogues members Weather Wizard, Tar Pit, and Fallout. Mirror Master then escapes from Iron Heights and pursues revenge against Captain Cold for imprisoning him. Captain Cold kills the Rogues members and then enters Mirror Master's Mirrorverse without warning. Mirror Master attempts to kill him, but Captain Cold pushes him out of the Mirrorverse and he dies.

25th Century Mirror Master
A futuristic version Mirror Monarch is a heroic Mirror Master as part of the 25th Century cops known as The Renegades from Professor Zoom's future, but was found dead by Barry Allen in public by a shadowy figure in a Flash suit. The Monarch's allies, from a futuristic, heroic incarnation of the Rogues, arrest Barry. However, after witnessing Barry's selfless heroism when their attempt to arrest him is interrupted by Captain Boomerang, the future version of the Top explains that Barry will kill Mirror Monarch because he mistook him for Mirror Master; the 'In Case of Flash' mirror will release the powerful demons known as the Mirror Lords, one of which will possess Iris, with Barry being forced to kill Mirror Master to send the demons back into the mirror or face Iris being permanently possessed by the Mirror Lord, only to kill Mirror Monarch by accident. When the Flash enters the gateway of unveil a giant mirror, but there are no demons or Mirror Lords only for it to show him a vision of his mother and he is caught by the Renegades. The Flash learns that Top is actually framing him for a crime he committed. The Flash is taken to a 25th-century courtroom and tells them, despite the historical evidence that the Mirror Lords did not escape and travels back to the 21st century to fight the Top. The Top reveals that he killed Mirror Monarch prevent the Flash from finding out that the Top's ancestor was the real murderer case which would cost him his job. The Renegades then take the Top back to the 25th century to be tried and the Flash finds the real murderer.

In other media

Television

Live-action

 The Sam Scudder incarnation of Mirror Master appears in The Flash (1990) episode "Done with Mirrors", portrayed by David Cassidy. This version is a criminal who uses holograms projected by small reflective disks to commit heists.
 Several variations of Mirror Master appear in The Flash (2014):
 Sam Scudder appears in the third and seventh seasons, portrayed by Grey Damon. Introduced in the episode "The New Rogues", this version was originally a member of Leonard Snart's gang before S.T.A.R. Labs' particle accelerator exploded, blasting Scudder into a mirror and seemingly turning him into a metahuman with the ability to travel through reflective surfaces as well as trap people inside such objects. After escaping three years later, he travels to Iron Heights Penitentiary to release his metahuman partner Rosalind Dillon so they can go on a crime spree together, only to be defeated by the Flash and Jesse Quick. As of the episode "All's Well That Ends Wells", Scudder and Dillon joined Black Hole until Eva McCulloch (see below) shatters him, revealing he was the first mirror duplicate she created.
 A company called McCulloch Technologies is introduced in the fifth season, in which they developed a mirror gun that Team Flash uses to destroy Cicada's dagger. A genderbent incarnation of Evan McCulloch named Eva McCulloch appears as a series regular beginning in the sixth season's second half, portrayed by Efrat Dor. A quantum engineer, co-founder of McCulloch Technologies, and wife of its CEO Joseph Carver, she was also blasted into a mirror and became a mirror duplicate like Scudder when S.T.A.R. Labs' particle accelerator exploded, though she was trapped for six years. After learning Carver stole her technology and used it to create Black Hole, McCulloch developed and honed her newfound ability to travel through reflective surfaces and manipulate mirror shards over the years to get revenge. During her sixth year in the mirrorverse, she traps several key figures with her and uses mirror duplicates of them as her proxies to procure technology so she can eventually escape the mirrorverse. Upon doing so, she kills Carver and retakes her company. In the seventh season, Eva attacks Black Hole's remnants, shattering Scudder's mirror duplicate along the way. After discovering her true nature and the Flash leaking it to the public, Eva goes berserk, takes the name "Mirror Monarch", and attempts to replace everyone in Central City with mirror duplicates until the Flash and Iris West-Allen convince her to stand down. Due to her duplicates having grown too powerful, the three destroy them before Eva releases her prisoners and leaves for the mirrorverse to start anew.

Animation
 An unidentified Mirror Master appears in the Super Friends: The Legendary Super Powers Show episode "Reflections in Crime", voiced by Casey Kasem.
 An amalgamated incarnation of Mirror Master appears in series set in the DC Animated Universe (DCAU), voiced by Alexis Denisof. This version is a small-time criminal like Sam Scudder and has mirror-based abilities similar to Evan McCulloch. After making minor appearances in Justice League, he appears in Justice League Unlimited as a member of the Rogues and Gorilla Grodd's Secret Society.
 The Sam Scudder incarnation of Mirror Master appears in the fifth season of The Batman, voiced by and modeled after John Larroquette. This version is a brilliant but mad optical physicist who is said to be the most powerful of the Flash's foes and is assisted by Smoke (voiced by Amanda Anka).
 The Evan McCulloch incarnation of Mirror Master appears in Batman: The Brave and the Bold, voiced by Tom Kenny.
 An unidentified Mirror Master appears in the Robot Chicken DC Comics Special, voiced by Breckin Meyer. This version is a member of the Legion of Doom.

Film
 The Sam Scudder incarnation of Mirror Master appears in Justice League: Doom, voiced again by Alexis Denisof. This version is a member of Vandal Savage's Legion of Doom.
 An unidentified Mirror Master makes a non-speaking appearance in Justice League: The Flashpoint Paradox as a member of the Rogues.
 The Evan McCulloch incarnation of Mirror Master appears in Injustice, voiced by Yuri Lowenthal.

Video games
 The Evan McCulloch incarnation of Mirror Master appears in DC Universe Online, voiced by Brandon Young.
 The Evan McCulloch incarnation of Mirror Master appears as a playable character in Lego DC Super-Villains, voiced by Sam Heughan. This version is a member of the Rogues and the Legion of Doom.

Miscellaneous
 An unidentified Mirror Master appeared in issue #23 of the Super Friends spin-off comic book.
 The Sam Scudder incarnation of Mirror Master is referenced in the Ookla the Mok song "Stranger in the Mirror".
 The DCAU incarnation of Mirror Master appears in issue #12 of the Justice League Unlimited tie-in comic book.
 The Sam Scudder incarnation of Mirror Master appears in issue #16 of the Batman: The Brave and The Bold tie-in comic book.
 The Evan McCulloch incarnation of Mirror Master appears in the Injustice: Gods Among Us prequel comic. First appearing as the leader of a U.S. government-backed strike team, they are hired to kidnap Jonathan and Martha Kent in an attempt to make the increasingly hostile Superman stand down and to stop meddling in government affairs or else they will kill the Kents and send him pieces of them. In response, the Justice League launch a manhunt for Mirror Master, interrogating several supervillains and the Rogues until Captain Cold gives up his location. Wonder Woman, the Flash, and Raven interrogate Mirror Master, eventually gleaning the Kents' location from him and using his technology to save them. Years later, Plastic Man breaks Mirror Master, among other supervillains, out of prison to help Batman's Insurgency cripple Superman's Regime. Mirror Master leads the Rogues in destroying several Regime bases around the world until they are attacked by Bizarro, who kills Heat Wave and Weather Wizard before the Trickster distracts him, allowing Mirror Master and his girlfriend Golden Glider to escape. The surviving Rogues later hold an informal memorial service for their fallen teammates and allow the Flash to join them after he promises not to turn them into Superman.

References

External links
 Alan Kistler's Profile On: THE FLASH - A detailed analysis of the history of the Flash by comic book historian Alan Kistler. Covers information all the way from Jay Garrick to Barry Allen to today, as well as discussions on the various villains and Rogues who fought the Flash. Various art scans.

Fictional drug addicts
Fictional cocaine users
Characters created by Grant Morrison
Comics characters introduced in 1959
Comics characters introduced in 1989
Fictional mercenaries in comics
DC Comics metahumans
Fictional characters with dimensional travel abilities
Fictional characters who can turn invisible
Fictional characters who can duplicate themselves
Fictional people from Glasgow
Characters created by John Broome
Characters created by Carmine Infantino
Fictional murderers
DC Comics characters who can teleport
DC Comics scientists
Flash (comics) characters